HNLMS Sumatra was a  of the Royal Netherlands Navy. She was launched during World War I and saw action during World War II. She was scuttled off the coast of Normandy on 9 June 1944 at Ouistreham as part of a "gooseberry" pier to protect an artificial Allied Mulberry Harbour built as part of Operation Overlord.

Construction
Sumatra was built by the Nederlandsche Scheepsbouw Maatschappij in Amsterdam. She was laid down on 15 July 1916 and launched on 29 December 1920 by Queen Wilhelmina of the Netherlands.

The turbines intended for the ship were destroyed by fire on 31 May 1922 at Werkspoor in Amsterdam.

Service history
On 26 May 1926 the ship was commissioned into the Dutch Navy. Later that year, on 21 September, Sumatra left the Netherlands for the Dutch East Indies, sailing via New York City, the Panama Canal, San Francisco, Shanghai and Nagasaki.

On 19 February 1927, Sumatra was deployed to Shanghai to protect Dutch citizens and interests because of rising tension between Nationalists and Communists. On 23 March, Sumatra and foreign warship prepared for the evacuation of civilians after fighting had broken out between Nationalists and Communists. A landing party of 140 men from the ship took up position in Shanghai's business quarter. Afterwards, Sumatra returned to Surabaya in the Dutch East Indies on 12 May 1927.

On 18 June 1930, she was recommissioned after an extensive refit at Surabaya after a turbine was damaged. On 28 July the ship returned to Surabaya for more repairs after a fire in the boiler room during speed trials.

Afterwards, she was towed to Surabaya for repair until 21 September.

From December 1933 until mid-1935, Sumatra was modernized at Surabaya. Among the improvements was the replacement of the original four 75 mm anti-aircraft guns by six 40 mm guns.

On 16 November 1935, Sumatra and the destroyers  and  visited Saigon.

Later that year, on 13 November, she and her sister ship and the destroyers Evertsen, Witte de With and Piet Hein visited Singapore. Before the visit they had exercised in the Chinese Sea.

On 8 June 1938 the ship sailed from Tanjung Priok to the Netherlands. From 8 to 17 July she performed convoy duties during the Spanish Civil War in the Strait of Gibraltar. Afterwards the ship returned to the Netherlands where she arrived on 22 July 1938 in Den Helder. Later that year on 3 September she participated in a fleet review off the coast of Scheveningen held in honor of Queen Wilhelmina who was than 40 years head of state.

World War II

As the Netherlands were overrun by the German Army during May 1940, Sumatra left the Netherlands for England.  After having a degaussing cable installed to protect her from magnetic mines, she proceeded to Milford Haven.  Princess Juliana of the Netherlands and her daughters were taken aboard there and transported to Halifax, Canada.  Afterwards she performed convoy escort duties and took part in the search for the German commerce raider Widder.

During the fall of 1940, Sumatra made her way to the Dutch East Indies where she was immediately laid up for an extensive overhaul.  This overhaul was not completed in January 1942 when the war with Japan began.  Sumatra was quickly recommissioned and, manned largely by midshipmen and capable of only 15 knots, she made her way to Ceylon.  Later in the year she made her way to Britain where she was laid up at Portsmouth.  Problems with her propulsion made her unfit for frontline duties. Transferred to the Royal Navy 29 April 1944. Sumatra was scuttled off the coast of Normandy on 9 June 1944 at Ouistreham, as part of a gooseberry pier to protect an artificial Mulberry Harbour built by the Allies as part of Operation Overlord. Sumatra‍ 's 150 mm guns were used to replace the guns of the s, which were worn out by extensive use.

On 14 February 1951 her wreck was auctioned with other wrecks to be scrapped.

References

Bibliography
 

Java-class cruisers
1920 ships
Maritime incidents in 1931
Operation Overlord
Maritime incidents in June 1944
Scuttled vessels
Shipwrecks of France
World War II cruisers of the Netherlands
Ships sunk as breakwaters